Sarre-Union is a commune in the Bas-Rhin department in Grand Est in north-eastern France.

It consists of two older towns that were unified on 16 June 1794. On the east bank of the river Sarre is the town of Bouquenom and on the west bank the town of Ville Neuve de Sarrewerden. It was renamed Saar-Buckenheim between 1940 and 1944 during Nazi Germany occupation.

See also
Communes of the Bas-Rhin department

References

Communes of Bas-Rhin
Bas-Rhin communes articles needing translation from French Wikipedia